is a retired Japanese Wrestler. She competed in 10 World Wrestling Championships and won 9 medals, including 5 gold medals.

Biography
Yoshimura aspired to be a professional wrestler when she was at Seijo Gakuen High School because she admired  (Chigusa Nagayo and Lioness Asuka). In 1986, She auditioned for Professional Wrestling, but was turned away because she was too short at 153 cm. At that time, she was invited by former world champion Tomiaki Fukuda, which led her to start Amateur Wrestling instead of professional wrestling.
In 1987, she entered Seijo University. That year, she competed and placed third at the first Women's World Championships in Oslo, Norway, in the 44kg weight class. She won the 1989 World Wrestling Championships for the first time, followed by the 1990 World Wrestling Championships.  She also won three consecutive World Championships from 1993 to 1995. 
She then had a period of time away from wrestling due to a knee injury, but continued to wrestle until 2004.
In 2009, she was inducted into the UWW (then FILA) Hall of Fame and has coached the Japanese women's national team since then. Among others, she has personally coached Yui Susaki since she was 13 years old, who won the gold medal in the 50kg weight class at the Tokyo Olympics.

References

External links
 
 Shoko Yoshimura Blog
 Wintarts Shoko Yoshimura

1968 births
Living people
Japanese female sport wrestlers
World Wrestling Championships medalists
Asian Wrestling Championships medalists
20th-century Japanese women